Mount Tabor is a neighborhood in southeastern Lexington, Kentucky, United States. Its boundaries are Alumni Drive to the west, New Circle Road to the north, Richmond Road to the east, and Man o' War Boulevard to the South.

Neighborhood statistics
 Population: 4,509
 Land area: 
 Population density: 5,367 per sq mile
 Median household income: $40,333

Neighborhoods in Lexington, Kentucky